Masotti is an Italian surname. It loosely means son of Maso, and the name Maso is derived from Tommaso, the Italian form of the name Thomas.

Notable people with this surname include:
 Baptiste Masotti (born 1995), French professional squash player
 Fabio Masotti (born 1974), Italian amateur road and track cyclist
 Ignazio Masotti (1817–1888), Italian cardinal
 Paul Masotti (born 1965), Canadian footballer